Borondougou is a commune in the Cercle of Mopti in the Mopti Region of Mali. The main village is Diambacourou. In 2009 the commune had a population of 9,056.

References

External links
.

Communes of Mopti Region